A Battle of Wits (1912) is a silent drama motion picture short starring Tom Moore, Alice Joyce and Earle Foxe.

Joyce and Foxe were working together for the fourth time on this picture.

A Battle of Wits was re-released on August 27, 1915.

Cast
Tom Moore as The Surveyor
Alice Joyce as Sue Elwood
Earle Foxe
Logan Paul
Stuart Holmes

External links

1912 films
1912 drama films
American black-and-white films
American silent short films
Kalem Company films
1912 short films
Silent American drama films
1910s American films
1910s English-language films
American drama short films